Luis Alfredo Ramírez Quioto (born 21 November 1977), nicknamed El Bombero (the Pumpman), is a Honduran former football striker who last played for Deportes Savio in the Honduran national league. He is nicknamed Bombero because he used to work at a gas station as a gas pump attendant.

Club career
Ramírez started his career at Independiente and made his professional debut on 10 June 1998 against Olimpia. He then played for Real España before a short stint with Chinese team Guangzhou Jili Cars. On his return to Honduras, he played for Universidad, Honduras Salzburg, Victoria and Marathón. He scored 59 league goals for them altogether from his debut until 2009.

Chinese years
In 2006, he tried his luck in the Chinese league, where he would stay for six years, playing for Shanghai Shenhua, Guangzhou Pharmaceutical and Hangzhou Greentown. In between he played the 2009 Clausura season with Marathón. Ramírez scored two goals for Guangzhou Pharmaceutical against Wuhan Guanggu in a 3-1 win on the opening fixture of the 2008 Chinese Super League Season. He is the first and the only player to win both Chinese Jia League and Chinese Super League golden boot award.

Return to Honduras
He returned to Honduras to play for Marathón in the 2012 Clausura. In summer 2012, el Bombero joined Honduras de El Progreso of the Honduran second division but he returned to the top flight to play in the 2013 Clausura for Deportes Savio.

Club career statistics in China

Statistics accurate as of 2 November 2011

Club career statistics in Marathón

Statistics accurate as of May 2014

International career
Ramírez made his senior debut for Honduras in an April 2000 FIFA World Cup qualification match against Nicaragua and he immediately scored his first international goal when coming on as a late sub for Milton Reyes. He has earned a total of 9 caps, scoring 1 goal. He represented his country in only 1 FIFA World Cup qualification match and played at the 2000 Summer Olympics. Ramirez also played for Honduras at the 1999 Pan American Games. He played at the 2005 UNCAF Nations Cup and 2011 Copa Centroamericana.

His final international was a January 2011 Copa Centroamericana match against El Salvador.

International goals

Honours

Club
 China League One: 2007

Individual
 China League One Golden Boot Winner: 2007
 Chinese Super League Golden Boot Winner: 2009

Notes

References

External links

 Diario La Prensa article

1977 births
Living people
People from San Pedro Sula
Association football forwards
Honduran footballers
Honduras international footballers
Independiente Villela players
Real C.D. España players
C.D. Victoria players
C.D. Marathón players
Shanghai Shenhua F.C. players
Guangzhou F.C. players
Zhejiang Professional F.C. players
Deportes Savio players
Honduran expatriate footballers
Honduran expatriate sportspeople in China
Expatriate footballers in China
Chinese Super League players
China League One players
Liga Nacional de Fútbol Profesional de Honduras players
Pan American Games medalists in football
Pan American Games silver medalists for Honduras
Footballers at the 1999 Pan American Games
Olympic footballers of Honduras
Footballers at the 2000 Summer Olympics
2005 UNCAF Nations Cup players
2011 Copa Centroamericana players
Copa Centroamericana-winning players
Medalists at the 1999 Pan American Games